CSF Sparta Chișinău is a Moldovan football club based in Chișinău, Moldova. They most recently played in the Moldovan "A" Division, the second tier of Moldovan football. In 2017 CSF Sparta Chisinau won Division B South, with the right to promote to Moldovan "A" Division. Also in 2017, CSF Sparta Chisinau started their own football school. The junior groups are playing in the National Division along with clubs with history and tradition in Moldovan football.

Achievements
Divizia B
 Winners (1): 2017

Divizia B
 Runners-up (2):  2016-2017
Winter Cup "Radautanu"
 Runners-up (2):'''Moldovan Winter Cup 2017

External links
Sparta Chișinău on Soccerway.com
Sparta Chișinăuon Facebook.com

Football clubs in Moldova
Football clubs in Chișinău
Association football clubs established in 2016
2016 establishments in Moldova